WYND-FM (95.5 MHz, "Wind-FM") is a commercial radio station in Silver Springs, Florida, broadcasting to the Ocala, Florida area. The same programming is simulcast on stations WNDN (Chiefland) and WNDD (Alachua).

External links
Official Website

YND-FM
Classic rock radio stations in the United States
Radio stations established in 1991
1991 establishments in Florida